The 1989 NCAA Division I Outdoor Track and Field Championships were contested May 31−June 3 at the Clarence F. Robison Track and Field Complex at Brigham Young University in Provo, Utah in order to determine the individual and team national champions of men's and women's collegiate Division I outdoor track and field events in the United States.

These were the 67th annual men's championships and the eighth annual women's championships. This was the Cougars' fourth time hosting the event and the first since 1982.

LSU topped both the men's and women's standings, the first time this occurred in the eight years since the NCAA expanded the championship to include women's events in 1982; it was the LSU men's team's second team title (and first since 1934−a span of fifty-five years) and the third consecutive, as well as third overall, for the Lady Tigers. This would go on to be the third of LSU's eleven consecutive women's national championships in track and field between 1987 and 1997.

Team results 
 Note: Top 10 only
 (H) = Hosts
 Full results

Men's standings

Women's standings

Individual results

References

NCAA Men's Outdoor Track and Field Championship
NCAA Division I Outdoor Track and Field Championships
NCAA
NCAA Division I Outdoor Track and Field Championships
NCAA Division I Outdoor Track and Field Championships
NCAA Women's Outdoor Track and Field Championship